The Parque de Fútbol Colegio Corazón de María is a 1,000-seat association football stadium in Juncos, Puerto Rico. As of the 2019-20 Liga Puerto Rico season, it hosts the home matches of Club de Balompie Junqueño .

References

External links
Soccerway profile

Football venues in Puerto Rico